Milton Ernest Ricketts (August 5, 1913 – May 8, 1942) was a United States Navy officer and a recipient of the United States military's highest decoration—the Medal of Honor—for his actions in World War II.

On May 8, 1942, during the Battle of the Coral Sea, Lieutenant Ricketts was in charge of a damage control party on board the Yorktown. When a Japanese bomb exploded among his group, he successfully undertook fire-fighting measures despite having received mortal wounds. For this act, Ricketts was posthumously awarded the Medal of Honor.

Ricketts was buried at sea; his name appears on the Tablets of the Missing at Manila American Cemetery and Memorial in the Philippines.

Medal of Honor citation
Lieutenant Ricketts' official Medal of Honor citation reads:
For extraordinary and distinguished gallantry above and beyond the call of duty as Officer-in-Charge of the Engineering Repair Party of the U.S.S. Yorktown in action against enemy Japanese forces in the Battle of the Coral Sea on 8 May 1942. During the severe bombarding of the Yorktown by enemy Japanese forces, an aerial bomb passed through and exploded directly beneath the compartment in which Lt. Ricketts' battle station was located, killing, wounding or stunning all of his men and mortally wounding him. Despite his ebbing strength, Lt. Ricketts promptly opened the valve of a near-by fireplug, partially led out the fire hose and directed a heavy stream of water into the fire before dropping dead beside the hose. His courageous action, which undoubtedly prevented the rapid spread of fire to serious proportions, and his unflinching devotion to duty were in keeping with the highest traditions of the U.S. Naval Service. He gallantly gave his life for his country.

Namesake
The Edsall-class destroyer escort  was named in his honor.

See also

List of Medal of Honor recipients

References

External links

1913 births
1942 deaths
United States Navy personnel killed in World War II
People who died at sea
Burials at sea
United States Navy Medal of Honor recipients
Military personnel from Baltimore
United States Naval Academy alumni
United States Navy officers
Baltimore City College alumni
World War II recipients of the Medal of Honor